Gateway is a neighborhood of the Mid-City region of San Diego, California.

Geography
Gateway's borders are defined by State Route 15 to the West, Interstate 805 to the Northeast, Home Avenue to the Southeast, and State Route 94 to the South.

Education
 Rowan Elementary School (San Diego Unified School District)

External links
Map: 

 

Neighborhoods in San Diego